Codes in the Clouds are an English post-rock band formed in July 2007. Consisting of Dartford, Kent natives Stephen Peeling, Ciaran Morahan, Jack Major and Joe Power, the group's music is instrumental post-rock. They have previously been signed with the independent London-based label Erased Tapes Records and Australian based label Hobbledehoy Records. They are currently signed to Erased Tapes Music for publishing.

Discography

Studio albums
 Paper Canyon (2009)
 As the Spirit Wanes (2011)
 Codes in the Clouds (2019)
 Piano Re-Works (2020)

Singles and EPs
 Distant Street Lights / Fractures (2007)

Remixes
 Paper Canyon Recycled (2010)
 Sixes and Seventeens (Versions) feat. Mogwai & 65daysofstatic (2021)

Members
 Stephen Peeling (guitar)
 Ciaran Morahan (guitar)
 Jack Major (drums)
 Joe Power (bass)

See also
 List of post-rock bands

References

External links
 Facebook Page
 Bandcamp Page
 Twitter Page
 Instagram Page

Musical groups established in 2007
English post-rock groups
Erased Tapes Records artists
2007 establishments in England